Cabernet can refer to several different things:

Wine grape varieties

 Cabernet Sauvignon, a hybrid of Cabernet Franc and Sauvignon blanc, and one of the most popular wine grapes in the world 
 Cabernet Franc, a parent of Cabernet Sauvignon and most often blended with it, but also used for varietals
 Cabernet Gros, a parent of Carménère
 Cabernet blanc, a German/Swiss hybrid of Cabernet Sauvignon and another unknown grape variety
 Cabernet Dorsa, a 1971 hybrid of Cabernet Sauvignon and Dornfelder, created in Germany
 Cabernet Gernischt, a Chinese variety similar or perhaps identical to Cabernet Sauvignon
 Cabernet Mitos, a 1970 hybrid of Cabernet Sauvignon and Blaufränkisch, created in Germany
 Béquignol noir, a French wine grape that has Cabernet as a synonym

Other uses
 Cabernet, a recurring enemy character in the anime Tegami Bachi